Elizabeth Ann McClanahan (born September 1, 1959) is a former Justice of the Supreme Court of Virginia. She was sworn in on September 1, 2011 for a term ending in 2023.  In January 2019, she announced that she would retire from the Court effective September 1 of that year.

Born in Buchanan County, Virginia, she received an undergraduate degree in government and sociology from the College of William and Mary (1981) and her J.D. degree from the University of Dayton (1984). She formerly chaired the State Council of Higher Education and served as vice rector of the College of William and Mary.  She formerly partnered with a law firm called Penn, Stuart, and Eskridge and served for more than eight years on the Virginia Court of Appeals as a Judge. She is a breast cancer survivor.

She became President and Dean of the Appalachian School of Law on September 2, 2019. She departed from this role, and is currently CEO of the Virginia Tech Foundation as of June 1, 2021. She is also currently a part of the McCammon Group as a mediator of legal disputes.

During her time on the Virginia Court of Appeals, she was honored in the 2011 list of "Influential Women of Virginia" by Virginia Lawyers Media. In 2021, she was recognized by Virginia Business in "Virginia 500: The 2021 Power List" in the Nonprofits/Philanthropy section.

References

1959 births
Living people
College of William & Mary alumni
People from Buchanan County, Virginia
University of Dayton alumni
Justices of the Supreme Court of Virginia
Judges of the Court of Appeals of Virginia
21st-century American judges
Deans of law schools in the United States
Women deans (academic)
21st-century American women judges